Cyrtophora unicolor is a species of spider of the genus Cyrtophora. It is known as the red tent spider.

Description
The species shows sexual dimorphism, where the male is small and with faded colors, whereas the female is much larger and with a brilliant red color. The female is 17-20mm in length.

The red tent spider builds a large three-dimensional web in vegetation, which is a common feature of members of the genus.

Distribution
It is found in numerous Asian countries, including Singapore, China, Southern Taiwan, Japan, Philippines, Papua New Guinea, Indonesia, Christmas Island, Sri Lanka, Thailand, Myanmar, and north-eastern India.

See also 
 List of Araneidae species

References

External links
Photos
A color-mediated mutualism between two arthropod predators.

unicolor
Spiders of Asia
Spiders described in 1857